The Cortes Gerais  (pre-1911 spelling: Cortes Geraes, meaning General Courts in Portuguese) were the parliament of the Kingdom of Portugal during the Constitutional Monarchy period.

The Cortes were established by provision of the Portuguese Constitution of 1822 as a unicameral parliament. However, the Constitutional Charter of 1826 reformed the Cortes as a bicameral legislature, with the Chamber of Most Worthy Peers of the Kingdom as its upper house and the Chamber of Gentlemen Deputies of the Portuguese Nation as its lower house. During the brief period in which the Constitution of 1838 was in force (1838-1842), the Chamber of Peers was abolished and replaced by the Chamber of the Senators or Senate. With the restoration of the Constitutional Charter in 1842, the Chamber of Peers was also restored as the upper chamber of the Cortes.

The name of the legislature originates from the traditional Portuguese Cortes, the assemblies of representatives of the three estates, during the period of absolute monarchy.

Since 1834, the Cortes had their seat in the Palace of the Cortes in Lisbon. This building was originally a Benedictine monastery and continues to be until today the seat of the Portuguese parliament, being presently referred as the São Bento Palace.

Gallery

References

Historical legislatures
Government of Portugal
Portuguese monarchy
1822 establishments in Portugal
1910 disestablishments in Portugal